Common stonechat is the name used for the Saxicola species Saxicola torquatus when this is treated in its broad sense.

It is, however, now more widely considered to be a superspecies consisting of several related but distinct species, which are outwardly fairly similar but genetically distinct and replacing each other geographically without significant hybridisation:
 African stonechat Saxicola torquatus in the strict sense
 European stonechat Saxicola rubicola
 Siberian stonechat Saxicola maurus
 Amur stonechat Saxicola stejnegeri
 Madagascar stonechat Saxicola sibilla

Three other species, not previously included within the broad view of common stonechat, have also been shown to be members of the superspecies:
 Fuerteventura chat Saxicola dacotiae
 Reunion stonechat Saxicola tectes
 White-tailed stonechat Saxicola leucurus

Species status possible, but not yet verified:
 Ethiopian stonechat Saxicola (torquatus) albofasciatus

Not all of the above are currently recognised as full species by all of the relevant taxonomical authorities, for example the British Ornithologists' Union, currently include stejnegeri as a subspecies of Saxicola maurus.

References

Saxicola